The Battle of Xiaoyao Ford, also known as the Battle of Leisure Ford, Battle of Hefei, and Hefei Campaign, was fought between the warlords Cao Cao and Sun Quan between 214 and 215 in the late Eastern Han dynasty. The two contending sides were fighting for control over a strategic fortress at Hefei, which was defended by Cao Cao's general Zhang Liao. Towards the end of the campaign, Zhang Liao made use of force concentration and launched a sneak counteroffensive on Sun Quan at Leisure Ford, where Sun only had 1,000 soldiers with him at the time. Amidst the chaos, Sun Quan barely escaped capture with the aid of his general Ling Tong. This action raised Zhang Liao to primacy among Cao Cao's generals.

Background

Long before Sun Quan solidified his control over southeastern China, Cao Cao had appointed Liu Fu as the Inspector of Yang Province, and had him build fortifications against besiegers. Liu Fu oversaw the construction of Hefei fortress, stocked with boulders, logs, and reserves of fish oil.

In late 208 after the Battle of Red Cliffs, Sun Quan led an army to invade Hefei but was unsuccessful despite several months of progress. The following year, the local parvenus and two former subordinates of Yuan Shu and Liu Fu, Chen Lan and Mei Cheng, rebelled in Lujiang after the death of Liu Fu (whom they trusted), but the revolt was suppressed by Cao Cao's generals Zhang Liao and Zang Ba. Cao Cao then ordered Zhang Liao, Yue Jin and Li Dian to lead 7,000 troops to enter Hefei fortress, Xiahou Dun to lead 26 juns (325,000 men) to prepare for probable attacks, and Xiahou Yuan to handle logistics. Chen Lan's ally, Lei Bo, surrendered to another warlord Liu Bei.

In 213 Cao Cao brought with him a 400,000 strong army to attack Sun Quan's 70,000 men at Ruxukou, but victory eluded him for more than a month, and he was forced on the defensive. After his repeated failures against the southerners, Cao Cao was worried that the various counties along the Yangtze River would be taken by Sun Quan, so he adopted a Fabian strategy and started to form military communities, families of soldiers concentrated in fortified towns. The Yangtze region became depopulated as residents were relocated except for Wan County (皖縣; present-day Qianshan County, Anhui), which was situated south of Hefei. Cao Cao appointed Zhu Guang as Administrator of Lujiang and garrisoned him at Wan County, promoting agriculture and bribing wealthy locals in Poyang to spy on Sun Quan's forces and harass the enemy's rear.

The campaign

Battle of Wan County
Around June or July 214, Sun Quan took advantage of heavy rains and floods in the Huai River region to sail up the Yangtze and attack Wan County, which served as a billet and storehouse for Zhang Liao's and Xiahou Dun's armies. Sun Quan faced two options: to build siege engines, or attack right away with foot soldiers. Lü Meng suggested the latter option and recommended Gan Ning to lead the offensive. Upon knowing Sun Quan had arrived on the battlefield, Zhang Liao moved out of Hefei fortress to reinforce Wan County. However, Sun Quan's energetic troops took Wan County within a day, and Zhu Guang was captured along with his advisor Dong He. By the time Zhang Liao reached Jiashi, he received news of the fall of Wan County and withdrew to Hefei.

Around this time, Liu Bei had taken over Yi Province (covering present-day Sichuan and Chongqing) from Liu Zhang, so Sun Quan sent Zhuge Jin to demand from Liu Bei the return of Jing Province. Liu Bei refused, and Guan Yu also drove away the officials Sun Quan sent to three commanderies in southern Jing Province. Sun Quan then withdrew his elite generals from the northern frontier and ordered Lü Meng and Ling Tong to lead 20,000 troops to take the three commanderies of Jing Province, while sending Lu Su to lead 10,000 men to garrison at Baqiu to resist Guan Yu, while he personally stationed at Lukou to serve as backup. Liu Bei also led his army to Gong'an and sent Guan Yu with 30,000 men to Yiyang. Lü Meng and Ling Tong took three commanderies by strategy and led their men with Sun Jiao and Pan Zhang to support Lu Su at Yiyang. Taking advantage of the Liu-Sun conflict, Cao Cao led an army to attack Zhang Lu of Hanzhong. Liu Bei was afraid that if Hanzhong fell to Cao Cao, Yi Province would be in peril as Hanzhong was the "gateway" to Yi Province. Hence, Liu Bei made peace with Sun Quan by dividing southern Jing Province. In return, Sun Quan promised to divert Cao Cao's attention from the west by attacking Hefei fortress.

An unorthodox order
The force at Hefei was outnumbered because Xiahou Dun's force was stationed at Juchao (居巢; in present-day Chaohu, Anhui) and it would take time for help to arrive. Only 7000 men were at the fortress. Before Cao Cao left to attack Zhang Lu, he left his representative Xue Ti with a letter that read "Open when the enemy arrives" on the envelope. As Sun Quan's army was already advancing towards Hefei, the defending generals opened the letter, which stated: "When Sun Quan arrives, generals Zhang (Liao) and Li (Dian) will engage him; General Yue (Jin) will remain behind to defend and not go into battle." This puzzled the generals, since it was well known that Li Dian and Zhang Liao had a personal feud, and Yue Jin lacked defensive experience, but was famous as the best vanguard in Cao Cao's forces. As the three of them did not get along well, Zhang Liao feared they might disobey orders. He said, "Our lord is away at war. By the time his reinforcements reach here, we're already done for. So he is actually instructing us to take advantage of the situation, when the enemy has just arrived and not fully gathered yet, to attack them and devastate their morale so as to calm our men and strengthen our defences. Victory or defeat, it all depends on this battle. Why are the two of you still hesitating?" Li Dian was moved and he said, "This is a national crisis. We'll see how your strategy works out. How can I let my personal affairs take precedence over my official duties?" Zhang Liao then selected 800 "die-hard" soldiers overnight in preparation for the upcoming battle, and threw a banquet for his men.

Battle around the fortress
The following morning, Zhang Liao led the 800 soldiers on a charge targeting Sun Quan's forces as they set up camp unafraid of Zhang Liao's small detachment. Xu Sheng and Song Qian in the front were routed after a brief skirmish, with Xu Sheng was wounded and disarmed, and Zhang Liao penetrated the camp. After personally killing tens of enemy soldiers and two officers, he cried out, "Zhang Liao is here!" Chen Wu, the commander of Sun Quan's bodyguards, went out to meet Zhang Liao's challenge. However, Chen Wu's unit was no match for Zhang Liao's and he was killed. Sun Quan was shocked by Zhang Liao's onslaught, and Xu Sheng and Song Qian's troops turned tail when they saw their commanders being killed or fleeing, and Pan Zhang killed two deserters. Ling Tong, just arrived on the field, led Sun Quan to a hill and ordered his men to use the long jis to a form a defensive line before he went down to fight Zhang Liao. At the bottom of the hill, Zhang Liao shouted for Sun Quan to come down and fight him, but Sun did not dare to move. When Sun Quan saw that the situation had become more stable and Zhang Liao was only left with slightly more than a hundred men, he ordered He Qi to surround Zhang Liao's men. During the battle He Qi retrieved Xu Sheng's personal mao (矛, a 5m long spear). Zhang Liao fought fiercely and succeeded in breaking out of the encirclement. When his remaining men, still trapped inside, shouted, "Has our general abandoned us?" Zhang Liao plowed back through enemy ranks and rescued his men. Sun Quan's men were stunned by Zhang Liao's valour and did not dare to stand in his way.

After the engagement, Pan Zhang was promoted to the rank of Lieutenant General while Ling Tong was appointed as Right Commander, but the long morning's battle had crushed the morale of Sun Quan's troops. Zhang Liao brought his survivors back to the city and fortified his defences. Zhang Liao's victory boosted his men's fighting spirits and reassured the defenders.

When Sun Quan's forces had all gathered, they launched an assault on the city. However, Hefei's defenses, prepared by Liu Fu, were not easy to breach. After several days, Sun Quan was still unable to take the city, when a plague broke out in his army, forcing Sun Quan to withdraw.

Battle at Xiaoyao Ford
In order to avoid being infected with the plague, Sun Quan ordered the rest of his units to retreat first while his guards, numbering only about 1,000, were the last to move. Zhang Liao, watching closely, seized this moment to counterattack, when Sun Quan had the fewest troops. He waited until Sun Quan's army had reached the northern crossing of Xiaoyao Ford when he, Li Dian, and Yue Jin led all their forces out of Hefei for an all-out assault.

When Sun Quan saw that the advancing attack, he realised his danger and hurriedly recalled his retreating units, but they could not return in time from the ships. As the 1,000 men of Sun Quan were engulfed by Zhang Liao's veteran cavalry, Ling Tong led a relief force of 300 horsemen to pierce the encirclement, keeping the enemy from Sun Quan and mauling Zhang Liao's army. As Sun Quan's side was in confusion and battle signals were not given, Gan Ning drummed the other units to action, while he personally shot arrows at the enemy.

As soon as Ling Tong dragged Sun Quan from the thick of the fight, he urged Sun to leave the battlefield while he stayed behind to cover his lord's escape. Sun Quan hurried to the southern shore until he reached the crossing at Xiaoyao Ford, but the bridge had been destroyed, leaving a nearly 10 metre-long gap. Gu Li, Sun Quan's attendant, told his master to sit tight, grab the reins firmly. Gu Li whipped the horse's flanks, and it made a mighty leap across to the southern side. Ling Tong turned back to hold off the enemy after seeing Sun Quan to safety.

On the northern shore, Ling Tong gave all for his lord's cause, fighting until all his 300 men had died and the other units had retreated. Zhang Liao and Li Dian wounded him. Knowing Sun Quan was safety away by this time, Ling Tong finally attempted to fight his way out. He single-handedly killed dozens of enemy horsemen blocking his way, and succeeded in breaking out, only to find all the roads blockaded. As the enemy closed in, Ling Tong quickly dove into the water before discarding his armour.

By that time, Sun Quan had already boarded a boat, and he delightedly rescued his general from the water, rejoicing in this miraculous reunion, but Ling Tong wept at the death of all his close aides. Sun Quan comforted him, saying, "Gongji (Ling Tong's courtesy name), let the dead go. As long as you live, why worry that you'll have no men under you?" Sun Quan later put Ling Tong in command of twice his previous force.

Aftermath
During a banquet hosted by Sun Quan after the battle, He Qi wept and said, "My lord, as a leader of men, you should be prudent. Today we were almost wiped out and the men are in shock. I hope you will learn from this lesson." Sun Quan thanked He Qi for his advice and promised to remember it for life.

When the battle was over, Zhang Liao, Li Dian, and Yue Jin lingered on the battlefield hoping to find Sun Quan's body. They were not aware that Sun Quan had already escaped until Zhang Liao asked a captive soldier, "Who was that purple-bearded, long-bodied, short-legged man so skilled in mounted archery?" The soldier replied it was Sun Quan. Zhang Liao then told Yue Jin that he regretted not chasing after this purple-bearded fighter, for he could have caught him.

When the news reached Cao Cao, he could hardly believe what his officers had achieved, so he later travelled to Xiaoyao Ford to scrutinize the battlefield. Zhang Liao was promoted to the rank of "General Conqueror of the East". Li Dian was granted 100 more households, for a total of 300. Yue Jin received 500 more taxable households, for a total of 1,200. Five hundred households were allotted to Yue Jin's son, who had also fought. Yue Jin's son also received the title of marquis, while the father was promoted to "General of the Right".

On Sun Quan's side, Ling Tong and Pan Zhang were promoted to "Lieutenant General" while Jiang Qin was appointed "General Vanquisher of Bandits". Sun Quan also attended Chen Wu's funeral and ordered Chen's favourite concubine to join him in death.

In popular culture
The battle is featured as a playable stage in Koei's video game series Dynasty Warriors. In the games, the battle is known as the "Battle of He Fei", and is not to be confused with another stage (Battle of Hefei Castle), which refers to the Battle of Hefei (234).

Notes

References
 Chen Shou. Records of the Three Kingdoms.

214
215
Xiaoyao Ford
Military history of Anhui
Xiaoyao Ford
Hefei